Yamina Bachir (20 March 1954 – 3 April 2022) was an Algerian film director and screenwriter. Her film Rachida was screened in the Un Certain Regard section at the 2002 Cannes Film Festival. According to Roy Armes, Rachida is 'the first 35mm feature directed by an Algerian woman in Algeria'. The film was primarily financed by French and European funding companies. It was popular in Algeria and was distributed internationally in France.

Career and personal life
Bachir attended the National Film School where she studied editing. She is best known for her work Rachida which took her five years to produce. Rachida has been the only Algerian film screened for the Un Certain Regard prize.

Bachir was married to fellow Algerian director Mohammed Chouikh. She has a son and three daughters. During the Black Decade, Bachir-Chouikh stayed in Algeria where she worked as a film editor on her husband's films.

Filmography
 Sandstorm (1982)
 Rachida (2002)

References

External links
 
 Yamina Bachir-Chouikh at Allocine. (French)
 
 

1954 births
2022 deaths
Algerian film directors
Algerian screenwriters
Algerian women writers
Algerian writers
Algerian women film directors
20th-century Algerian people
21st-century Algerian people
Writers from Algiers